Eddie Dibbs was the defending champion but did not compete that year.

Corrado Barazzutti won in the final 7–6, 7–6, 6–7, 3–6, 6–4 against Brian Gottfried.

Seeds
Text in italics indicates the round seeds were eliminated.

  Brian Gottfried (final)
  Raúl Ramírez (first round)

Draw

 NB: The Semifinals and Final were the best of 5 sets while all other rounds were the best of 3 sets.

Final

Section 1

Section 2

External links
 1977 Paris Open draw

Singles